Ute Starke (born 14 January 1939) is a German former gymnast. She competed at the 1960, 1964 and 1968 Summer Olympics in all artistic gymnastics events and finished in sixth, fourth and third place with the German and later East German teams. Individually her best achievement was sixth place on the vault in 1964. She won a gold and a silver medal in this event at the European championships of 1961 and 1965.

She was elected 1961 East German Sportswoman of the Year after winning the European Championship on the vault. She was one of the first gymnasts from the former GDR who reached world class status. Between 1961 and 1965 Starke won seven East German individual titles. She is now considered responsible for the rise of world class women's gymnastics in East Germany, and later became a longtime gymnast coach at her home club SC Leipzig.

See also
 List of female artistic gymnasts with the most appearances at Olympic Games

References

1939 births
Living people
German female artistic gymnasts
Olympic gymnasts of the United Team of Germany
Olympic gymnasts of East Germany
Gymnasts at the 1960 Summer Olympics
Gymnasts at the 1964 Summer Olympics
Gymnasts at the 1968 Summer Olympics
Olympic bronze medalists for East Germany
Olympic medalists in gymnastics
Medalists at the 1968 Summer Olympics
European champions in gymnastics
People from Eisleben
Sportspeople from Saxony-Anhalt